Panasonic Open may refer to:

 Panasonic Open (Japan), a golf tournament in Japan
 Panasonic Open (India), a golf tournament in India